The 2007 Gravesham Borough Council election took place on 3 May 2007 to elect members of Gravesham Borough Council in Kent, England. The whole council was up for election and the Conservative Party gained overall control of the council from the Labour Party.

Background
Before the election Labour had run the council since 1995 and since the 2003 election had 23 seats, compared to 21 for the Conservatives. The Conservatives had therefore needed to gain 2 seats to take control from Labour.

Election result
The results saw the Conservatives gain control of the council from Labour, the first time the Conservatives had control of the council in 20 years. The Conservatives moved to 26 seats after winning 54% of the vote, while Labour dropped to 16 seats on a 40% vote share. Overall turnout at the election was 36.4%, up from 31% at the 2003 election.

The Conservative gains included taking all 3 seats in the wards of Painters Ash and Singlewell from Labour. The Conservatives also held the seats in Whitehill where the two sitting councillors, George Lambton and Derek Robinson, had stood as independents after being deselected by the Conservatives before the election. The leader of the Conservatives on the council, Michael Snelling, said "I am over the moon. I think we have exceeded our expectations.", while the Labour council leader, John Burden said he planned "to come back in four years' time".

The election in Meopham North was postponed after the death of one of the Conservative councillors Malcolm Burgoyne on 25 April. The delayed election in Meopham North was held on 21 June and saw the Conservatives hold both seats in the ward. The Conservative leader, Michael Snelling, was one of the two winners in Meopham North and as a result was able to then become the new leader of the council.

Ward results

Note: The election in Meopham North was delayed to 21 June due to the death of a candidate.

References

2007 English local elections
2007
2000s in Kent